The Bungil Creek, part of the Balonne catchment within the Murray-Darling basin, is a perennial stream located in South West Queensland, Australia.

Course and features
The creek flows southeast through the town of Roma, with the Carnarvon Highway following much of the course of the creek. The flow of the creek varies significantly from a very small trickle to a raging river after heavy rain.

The creek floods regularly, once inundating hundreds of properties in Roma. Government funding enabled the construction of a levee for flood mitigation after devastating flooding in 2012.

See also

References

Rivers of Queensland
Murray-Darling basin
South West Queensland